Ploshcha Yakuba Kolasa is a Minsk Metro station. Opened on June 24, 1984.

Station was named after Belarusian writer Yakub Kolas, and literally means Square of Yakub Kolas.

Gallery 

Minsk Metro stations
Railway stations opened in 1984